Bolton College (previously known as Bolton Community College) is a further education college located in Bolton, Greater Manchester, England.

The college is primarily based in Bolton, but operates a number of Community Learning Centres in the surrounding area. The college provides a range of courses that include vocational education, work-based learning, ESOL courses, Diplomas, apprenticeships, Access courses and Higher Education courses.

The college's most recent OFSTED report (March 2017) gave the college an overall grade of 'Good'.

Notable alumni
 Amir Khan, Boxer
 Peter Kay, Comedian

References

External links 
 Bolton College homepage

Buildings and structures in Bolton
Education in the Metropolitan Borough of Bolton
Further education colleges in Greater Manchester